Elicha Sar-Shalom Ahui (born 28 December 2003) is a professional footballer who plays as a defender for Drogheda United on loan from Lincoln City.

Club career

Lincoln City
Ahui was released by Nottingham Forest at the age of 16, and joined Lincoln City on the club's Shadow Scholar programme, which would see him sign his first professional contract with Lincoln City on 21 March 2022. He would have a loan spell with local side Gainsborough Trinity making his debut against Hyde United on 21 December 2021. The following season he would make his Lincoln City debut against Newcastle United U21, starting the game in the EFL Trophy on 18 October 2022. On 31 January 2023, he joined Drogheda United on loan for the season, with teammate Freddie Draper.

Career statistics

References 

2003 births
Living people
Sportspeople from Derry (city)
Republic of Ireland association footballers
Republic of Ireland youth international footballers
Republic of Ireland international footballers from Northern Ireland
Association footballers from Northern Ireland
Association football forwards
Lincoln City F.C. players
Gainsborough Trinity F.C. players
Drogheda United F.C. players
League of Ireland players
Expatriate association footballers in the Republic of Ireland